Christopher Fulmer  (July 4, 1858 – November 9, 1931), was a Major League Baseball player who played catcher.  He played for the Washington Nationals of the Union Association in 1884 and for the Baltimore Orioles of the American Association from 1886 to 1889.

External links

1858 births
1931 deaths
Major League Baseball catchers
Washington Nationals (UA) players
Baltimore Orioles (AA) players
19th-century baseball players
People from Tamaqua, Pennsylvania
Peoria Reds players
Washington Nationals (minor league) players
Hamilton Hams players
Montreal (minor league baseball) players
Baseball players from Pennsylvania